Steve Fawkner is an Australian video game designer, programmer, and composer. He created the Warlords game series in 1989 and more recently the Puzzle Quest series.

Career
In 2003, after a long alliance with SSG, he split off to form his own game development company Infinite Interactive.

In 2007, Infinite Interactive put Puzzle Quest: Challenge of the Warlords on the market for the DS and PSP. It was a sleeper hit that received critical acclaim from gamers and game developers alike. Infinite Interactive has since ported Puzzle Quest to the Wii, Windows, Xbox 360, PS2, Mac, mobile, and iPhone.

In 2008, a Puzzle Quest spin-off game was developed on a number of platforms for D3 Publisher. Puzzle Quest: Galactrix was released on 24 February 2009. While critics praised the variety of the gameplay, it wasn't as well received as Puzzle Quest: Challenge of the Warlords. A full sequel to Puzzle Quest, Puzzle Quest 2, was released on 22 June 2010 and was seen as a return to form for the Puzzle Quest series.

Fawkner and Infinite Interactive licensed the game design to Boston-based Demiurge Studios to create Marvel Puzzle Quest: Dark Reign, while he worked on another project he called "Puzzle Quest and Warlords thrown together in a blender." Gems of War was released on 20 November 2014 and is still being supported with updates and events.

In 2016 as director of Infinity Plus Two, Steve designed and, the company self published another mixed mechanic game called Tiny Quest. The game was released on iOS and Android in 2017, it was well received with plans to build on the game with a sequel.

Games developed
 Puzzle Quest 3 (2021), Infinity Plus 2
 Tiny Quest (2017), Infinity Plus 2
 Gems of War (2014), 505 Games Mobile
 Puzzle Quest 2 (2010), D3 Publisher
 Puzzle Chronicles (2010), Konami Digital Entertainment, Inc.
 Puzzle Kingdoms (2009), Zoo Games
 Neopets Puzzle Adventure (2009), Capcom
 Puzzle Quest: Galactrix (2009), D3 Publisher of Europe Ltd.
 Puzzle Quest: Challenge of the Warlords (2007), D3 Publisher of Europe Ltd.
 Heroes of Might and Magic V (2006), Ubisoft Italia
 Warlords Battlecry III (2004), Enlight Interactive Inc.
 Decisive Battles of WWII Vol 2: Korsun Pocket (2003), Matrix Games
 Warlords IV: Heroes of Etheria (2003), Ubisoft
 Warlords Battlecry II (2002), Strategic Studies Group
 Reach for the Stars (2000), Strategic Simulations, Inc.
 Warlords Battlecry (2000), Strategic Simulations, Inc.
 Warlords III: Darklords Rising (1998), Red Orb Entertainment
 Warlords III: Reign of Heroes (1997), Red Orb Entertainment
 Warlords II Deluxe (1995), Strategic Studies Group
 Warlords II Scenario Builder (1994), Strategic Studies Group
 Carriers at War II (1993), Strategic Studies Group
 Warlords II (1993), Strategic Studies Group
 Warlords (1990), Strategic Studies Group

References

External links
Steve Fawkner profile at infinite-interactive.com

1968 births
Australian computer programmers
Australian composers
Australian male composers
Living people
Video game designers
Video game programmers
Video gaming in Australia